Cracked Rear View is the debut studio album by Hootie & the Blowfish, released on July 5, 1994, by Atlantic Records. Released to positive critical reviews, it eventually sold 10.2 million copies in the United States, becoming one of the best-selling albums of all time.

Recording
Don Gehman was chosen by A&R man Tim Sommer as a producer because of his previous work with John Mellencamp and R.E.M.

Reception

Cracked Rear View is Hootie & the Blowfish's most successful album. Cracked Rear View reached number one on the Billboard 200 five times over the course of 1995. It was the best-selling album of 1995 in the United States, selling 7 million copies. It has sold 10.2 million copies in the United States per Nielsen SoundScan as of 2012. An additional three million copies were sold through CD clubs, which are not included in SoundScan's total. The album has been certified 21x platinum (double diamond) as of 2018. It is the joint 19th-best-selling album of all time in the United States. The album also reached number one in Canada and New Zealand.

Critical reviews of Cracked Rear View were mostly positive. AllMusic's Stephen Thomas Erlewine crowned the album as "the success story of 1994/1995." He also stated "Although Hootie & the Blowfish aren't innovative, they deliver the goods, turning out an album of solid, rootsy folk-rock songs that have simple, powerful hooks."

Track listing
All songs written by Mark Bryan, Dean Felber, Darius Rucker and Jim "Soni" Sonefeld, except where noted.
 "Hannah Jane" – 3:33
 "Hold My Hand" – 4:15
 "Let Her Cry" – 5:08
 "Only Wanna Be with You" – 3:46 (Bryan, Felber, Rucker, Sonefeld, Bob Dylan)
 "Running from an Angel" – 3:37
 "I'm Goin' Home" – 4:10
 "Drowning" – 5:01
 "Time" – 4:53
 "Look Away" – 2:38
 "Not Even the Trees" – 4:37
 "Goodbye" – 4:05
Includes hidden track "Sometimes I Feel Like a Motherless Child" (Traditional) – 0:53

In 2001, the album was re-released on DVD-Audio with the disc featuring a discography, photo gallery, and video of a live performance of "Drowning".

The 25th anniversary edition from 2019 includes the following bonus discs:

Disc 2: B-sides, Outtakes, Pre-LP Independent Recordings
"All That I Believe"
"I Go Blind" (Neil Osborne, Phil Comparelli, Brad Merritt, Darryl Neudorf)
"Almost Home"
"Fine Line"
"Where Were You"
"Hey, Hey What Can I Do" (John Bonham, John Paul Jones, Jimmy Page, Robert Plant)
"The Old Man and Me" – Kootchypop Version
"Hold My Hand" – Kootchypop Version
"If You're Going My Way" – Kootchypop Version
"Sorry's Not Enough" – Kootchypop Version
"Only Wanna Be with You" – Kootchypop Version
"Running from an Angel" – 1991 Version
"Time" – 1991 Version
"Let Her Cry" – 1991 Version
"Drowning" – 1991 Version
"I Don't Understand"
"Little Girl"
"Look Away" – 1990 Version
"Let My People Go"
"Hold My Hand" – 1990 Version

Disc 3: Live at Nick's Fat City, Pittsburgh, PA, February 3, 1995
"Hannah Jane"
"I Go Blind"
"Not Even the Trees"
"If You're Going My Way"
"Look Away"
"Fine Line"
"Let Her Cry"
"Motherless Child"
"I'm Goin' Home"
"Use Me"
"Running from an Angel"
"Sorry's Not Enough"
"Drowning"
"The Old Man and Me"
"Only Wanna Be with You"
"Time"
"Goodbye"
"The Ballad of John and Yoko" (Lennon-McCartney)
"Hold My Hand"
"Love the One You're With" (Stephen Stills)

DVD
5.1 Surround Sound mix of the original album
Hi-Res 24/96 Bonus Tracks 
"All That I Believe"
"I Go Blind"
"Almost Home"
"Fine Line"
"Where Were You"
Music videos:
"Hold My Hand"
"Let Her Cry"
"Only Wanna Be with You"
"Time"
"Drowning" – Live

Personnel
Hootie & the Blowfish
 Mark Bryan – electric guitar, acoustic guitar, vocal percussion, mandolin on "Only Wanna Be with You", piano on "Not Even the Trees", 
 Dean Felber – bass guitar, clavinet, vocals, piano on "Only Wanna Be with You"
 Darius Rucker – vocals, acoustic guitar, percussion
 Jim "Soni" Sonefeld – drums, percussion, vocals, piano on "Look Away" and "Goodbye", glasses on "Not Even the Trees"

Additional musicians
 David Crosby – background vocals on "Hold My Hand"
 Lili Haydn – violin on "Look Away" and "Running from an Angel"
 John Nau – piano on "I'm Goin' Home", Hammond organ

Production
 Jean Cronin – art direction
 Don Gehman – production, engineering, mixing
 Michael McLaughlin – photography
 Wade Norton – assistant engineering
 Gena Rankin – production coordination
 Eddy Schreyer – mastering
 Tim Sommer – artists and repertoire
 Liz Sroka – assistant mixing

Charts

Weekly charts

Year-end charts

Decade-end charts

Certifications

Awards

See also

 List of best-selling albums in the United States

References

1994 debut albums
Hootie & the Blowfish albums
Albums produced by Don Gehman
Atlantic Records albums